RCAF Station Kingston was a World War II air training station built in 1940 at Collins Bay near Kingston, Ontario, Canada. The station was originally built by the Royal Canadian Air Force (RCAF) for use by the Royal Air Force (RAF). Like other RAF schools in Canada, it was subject to RCAF administrative and operational control.

History
No. 31 Service Flying Training School (SFTS) was the first British Service Flying Training school to be established in Canada and the first flying training school at Kingston. The school was originally No. 7 Service Flying School based in Peterborough, England.   Its main purpose was to train pilots for the Fleet Air Arm, but in the beginning the school's first students were British Commonwealth Air Training Plan (BCATP) trainees selected for service with the RCAF and RAF. Naval trainees, however, made up the majority of the trainees by the end of December 1940. Pilots were trained on Fairey Battles, which were shipped from England, and later, Harvards. In 1942, the school formally became part of the British Commonwealth Air Training Plan. In 1944 No. 31 SFTS was merged with the RCAF's No. 14 SFTS when this school was transferred to Kingston from RCAF Station Aylmer. Aircraft used by No. 14 SFTS included Harvards, Yales and Ansons. No. 14 SFTS closed down in September 1945. Relief landing fields were located at Gananoque and Sandhurst, Ontario. The aerodrome has been improved over the years and is now the Kingston/Norman Rogers Airport.

Aerodrome information  
The airfield was constructed in a typical BCATP wartime pattern, with six runways formed in an overlaid triangle.  
Six runways were listed as follows:

Relief landing field - Sandhurst  
The runway was listed as a "Turf - All-way field with dimensional data as follows:

Notable aircrew
Some of the more noteworthy pilots who trained at this station include:
 David Clarabut, RNVR(A) who earned a Distinguished Service Cross (DSC) for his role on the attack on the 
 Robert Hampton Gray, VC, DSC, RCNVR, Canada's last Victoria Cross recipient of the Second World War 
 Gordon Cheeseman Edwards, RCNVR Mentioned in Despatches for the attacks on the Tirpitz 
 Philip Steele Foulds, RCNVR who earned a DSC for his role in an attack on an enemy convoy

Remembrance
Forty-nine airmen lost their lives while serving at Kingston, most in flying accidents. Three of these men, A/LA Moore, J.C., Lieut. Edwards, R.C., and A/LA Scorrow, E., perished when their aircraft crashed in Lake Ontario, and as of 2014 they have not been recovered.

References

External links
 Military Bruce - Canadian Military History - The British Commonwealth Air Training Plan Retrieved: 2010-08-12
 BCATP Information from Bombercrew.com Retrieved: 2009-12-13
 "Harvards Above" by Geraldine Ellen Chase Retrieved: 2016-11-21

Kingston
Canadian Forces bases in Canada (closed)
Kingston